Nashmead (formerly, Nash) is an unincorporated community in Mendocino County, California.

A post office operated at Nashmead from 1915 to 1960. The name honors J. Nash, its first postmaster. The name Nashmead was formed from "Nash's Meadows".

References

Unincorporated communities in California
Unincorporated communities in Mendocino County, California